Loireauxence is a commune in the department of Loire-Atlantique, western France. The municipality was established on 1 January 2016 by merger of the former communes of Varades, Belligné, La Chapelle-Saint-Sauveur and La Rouxière.

Population

See also 
Communes of the Loire-Atlantique department

References 

Communes of Loire-Atlantique
Populated places established in 2016
2016 establishments in France